Moone Boy is an Irish sitcom created, co-written by and co-starring Chris O'Dowd for British broadcaster Sky One. The series is co-written by Nick Vincent Murphy and is produced by Baby Cow Productions, Sprout Pictures, Hot Cod Productions, and Grand Pictures. The series is semi-autobiographical of O'Dowd and focuses on a young boy's life growing up in Boyle, County Roscommon, in the west of Ireland in the late 1980s and early 1990s. Moone Boy is the second series produced from Sky One's Little Crackers shorts and is inspired by O'Dowd's contribution, "Capturing Santa", which was produced by Sprout Pictures.

The introductory music for much of each episode is "Tico's Tune" by Geoff Love (recorded by him under the name "Manuel & The Music of the Mountains"). This piece of music has near-iconic status in Ireland as it was used as the theme music for The Gay Byrne Show, a long-running and immensely popular morning radio show on RTÉ Radio 1. Background music and soundtrack pieces were composed for the series by Rónán Johnston. The opening credits are accompanied with the song "Where's Me Jumper" by The Sultans of Ping FC.

Moone Boy aired its third and final series in 2015.

Synopsis
Seán Murphy is the imaginary friend of 12-year-old Martin Paul Moone, the only boy in a family living in Boyle, a small town in County Roscommon in the rural West of Ireland. Martin, aided by his imaginary friend, has a unique perspective on life. His imagination comes into play both in his childish drawings, which come alive through animation, and in the ridiculous schemes he comes up with, against Seán's better judgement. With Seán's help, Martin negotiates life as the youngest member of a chaotic, scatterbrained family.

Production
Chris O'Dowd said: "Moone Boy is a fantastic comedy which centres on a twelve-year-old boy who has an imaginary friend. It is set in the late eighties/early nineties and all of the experiences are ones that I had. It's a really funny show which has loads of animation and a number of laughs that I hope people will love. It was essential to film in Ireland and what was great about Sky was they wanted us to film here and they were really supportive. That wouldn't have happened at any other channel."

Moone Boy is Sky's second commission based on a Little Crackers short. The series is a co-production between Sprout Pictures, who produced the original Little Crackers short, Baby Cow Productions, Hot Cod Productions and Grand Pictures, and began filming in early 2012 on location in Boyle and other places in County Roscommon, as well as County Wicklow.

Cast
 Chris O'Dowd as Seán Caution Murphy
 David Rawle as Martin Moone
 Deirdre O'Kane as Debra Moone
 Peter McDonald as Liam Moone
 Ian O'Reilly as Padraic O'Dwyer
 Aoife Duffin as Trisha Moone
 Clare Monnelly as Fidelma Moone
 Sarah White as Sinéad Moone
 Steve Coogan as Francie "Touchy" Fehily
 Evan O'Hanlon as Paulie
 Johnny Vegas as Crunchie Haystacks
 Steve Wall as Danny Moone
 Norma Sheahan as Linda
 Ronan Raftery as Dessie
 Tom Hickey as Granddad Joe

Episodes

Series 1 (2012)

Series 2 (2014)

Series 3 (2015)

Reception
The show has been well received by critics. The Guardian called it "the most life-affirming delight to have hit our screens in a long time", and said: "It is surreal, within decent limits, and it is derivative, but I think the derivations are happily if tacitly acknowledged". Moone Boy won an International Emmy for Best Comedy and was also nominated for two awards at the 2012 British Comedy Awards.
In 2014, it won an IFTA Award for best entertainment programme.

Home media
The first series of Moone Boy was released on DVD on 15 October 2012.
The second series of Moone Boy was released on DVD on 31 March 2014. A boxset containing the first two series was also released on 31 March 2014.

American remake
It was announced in October 2014 that the show received a "Put-pilot" from ABC. O'Dowd is said to be a writer and producer, but is not expected to star.

References

External links
 Official website
 Chris O'Dowd interview (40:08) 5.29.2014 by Terry Gross of Fresh Air on NPR

 Moone Boy Series 1 at PBS
 Moone Boy Series 2 at PBS
 
 

2012 Irish television series debuts
2015 Irish television series endings
International Emmy Award for best comedy series winners
Irish television sitcoms
Sky sitcoms
Television series about children
Television series set in 1989
Television series set in 1990
Television series set in 1991
Television series with live action and animation
Television shows set in the Republic of Ireland
Television shows filmed in the Republic of Ireland